Bidwill may refer to:

Places
Bidwill, New South Wales, a suburb of Blacktown
Bidwill, Queensland, a locality in Queensland, Australia

People
Bidwill (surname)

See also
Bidhawal, an Australian Aboriginal people.
Bidwell (disambiguation)